Stella Oyella (born 8 February 1990) is an Ugandan netball player who represents Uganda internationally and plays in the position of goal attack. She has represented Uganda at the 2018 Commonwealth Games and also competed at two World Cup tournaments in 2015 and in 2019.

In September 2019, she was included in the Ugandan squad for the 2019 African Netball Championships.

Known for her hard work and physical presence in the game, she's described as not only being a tough attacker but also a great ball winner especially during recoveries.

References 

1990 births
Living people
Ugandan netball players
Netball players at the 2018 Commonwealth Games
Commonwealth Games competitors for Uganda
2019 Netball World Cup players
2015 Netball World Cup players
20th-century Ugandan women
21st-century Ugandan women